As of July 2016, the International Union for Conservation of Nature (IUCN) lists 2843 least concern insect species. 47% of all evaluated insect species are listed as least concern. 
The IUCN also lists 12 insect subspecies as least concern.

No subpopulations of insects have been evaluated by the IUCN.

This is a complete list of least concern insect species and subspecies as evaluated by the IUCN.

Earwigs
Spirolabia browni

Blattodea

Phasmatodea species

Termites
Nasutitermes maheensis
Neotermes laticollis

Orthoptera
There are 184 species and six subspecies in the order Orthoptera assessed as least concern.

Crickets

Acridids

Tettigoniids

Species

Subspecies
Clonia wahlbergi wahlbergi
Lesser reed katydid (Pseudorhynchus pungens meridionalis)

Rhaphidophorids

Phaneropterids

Species

Subspecies

Other Orthoptera species

Hymenoptera
There are 106 species in the order Hymenoptera assessed as least concern.

Ants
Leptothorax recedens

Colletids

Melittids

Apids

Halictids

Andrenids

Megachilids

Mantises

Lepidoptera
Lepidoptera comprises moths and butterflies. There are 420 species and one subspecies in the order Lepidoptera assessed as least concern.

Swallowtail butterflies

Lycaenids

Nymphalids

Skippers

Species

Subspecies
Oreisplanus munionga larana

Pierids

Riodinids

Beetles
There are 423 beetle species assessed as least concern.

Geotrupids

Longhorn beetles

Click beetles

Eucnemids

Scarabaeids

Other beetle species

Odonata
Odonata includes dragonflies and damselflies. There are 1690 species and five subspecies in the order Odonata assessed as least concern.

Platystictids

Chlorogomphids

Argiolestids

Perilestids

Chlorocyphids

Platycnemidids

Species

Subspecies
Platycnemis pennipes nitidula

Synlestids

Megapodagrionids

Gomphids

Cordulegastrids

Corduliids

Calopterygids

Coenagrionids

Species

Subspecies
Pele damselfly (Megalagrion amaurodytum peles)

Euphaeids

Synthemistids

Macromiids

Lestids

Aeshnids

Libellulids

Species

Subspecies

Polythorids

Other Odonata species

See also 
 Lists of IUCN Red List least concern species
 List of near threatened insects
 List of vulnerable insects
 List of endangered insects
 List of critically endangered insects
 List of recently extinct insects
 List of data deficient insects

References 

Insects
Least concern insects
Least concern insects
Least concern insects